is a Japanese politician of the Constitutional Democratic Party of Japan. She was a member of the House of Representatives in the Diet (national legislature) representing Hokkaido through the Hokkaido PR block.

Biography 
Ikeda was born in Itabashi, Tokyo in 1972. Her childhood was marred by abuse from her father, which led her family to disintegrate by the time she was in middle school. Ikeda studied up to second year of high school before dropping out as she was unable to pay for her tuition.

In 1995, she trained as a caregiver and then worked at the Itabashi welfare office. Later in 1997, she enrolled in a Tokyo vocational school and received a qualification in welfare. She worked in the office until 2011, when she moved to Hokkaido to head an NGO focusing on rebuilding the lives of welfare recipients and pensioners. Several years after settling in Hokkaido, she entered Hokkaido University as a mature student and took a postgraduate course in Public Policy. She graduated in March 2015.

Ikeda first ran for public office in the 2014 general election. She ran as an independent candidate for the Hokkaido 2nd district seat with the support of the centre-left Democratic Party of Japan, finishing in the third place. She would then become the official opposition candidate for the neighbouring Hokkaido 5th district seat in the 2016 by-election, but lost narrowly to the LDP candidate Yoshiaki Wada. Ikeda ran again for the seat in the 2017 general election. She narrowly lost her rematch with Wada but obtained enough votes to be returned through the CDP's PR block list.

Ikeda is a single mother with two adult children.

References

External links 
 Official website in Japanese.

1972 births
Living people
Politicians from Hokkaido
Members of the House of Representatives (Japan)
Constitutional Democratic Party of Japan politicians
Democratic Party of Japan politicians
21st-century Japanese politicians
21st-century Japanese women politicians